Tatyana Gigel (Russian: Татьяна Анатольевна Гигель; born 27 February 1960) is a Russian politician serving as a senator from the State Assembly of the Altai Republic since 1 October 2019.

Gigel is under personal sanctions introduced by the European Union, the United Kingdom, the USA, Canada, Switzerland, Australia, Ukraine, New Zealand, for ratifying the decisions of the "Treaty of Friendship, Cooperation and Mutual Assistance between the Russian Federation and the Donetsk People's Republic and between the Russian Federation and the Luhansk People’s Republic" and providing political and economic support for Russia's annexation of Ukrainian territories.

Biography

Gigel was born on 27 February 1960. In 1987, she graduated from the Siberian State Technological University. Until early 2000s, she worked at the Karakoksha timber industry enterprise.

From 2001 to 2014, Gigel served as a deputy of the State Assembly of the Altai Republic from the Choysky District. In September 2014, she was elected as a Senator from the State Assembly of the Altai Republic. In 2019, she headed the regional branch of the United Russia in the Altai Republic.

References

Living people
1960 births
United Russia politicians
21st-century Russian politicians
Members of the Federation Council of Russia (after 2000)